The R324 is a Regional Route in South Africa that connects Barrydale to the north with  Port Beaufort and Witsand to the south.

Route
Originating from the R62 at Barrydale it heads south over the Tradouw Pass. At the end of the pass, it reaches a t-junction. The western route is signed as the R324 and the eastern as the R322. The westerly R324 passes through Suurbraak and then reaches the N2. It is co-signed briefly heading east. Diverging from the N2, the route then heads south-south-east to Port Beaufort. Here the R322 rejoins the route. The R324 then runs east to end at the neighbouring village of Witsand.

External links
 Routes Travel Info
 Tradouw Pass

References

Regional Routes in the Western Cape